This is a discography for the work of Sly Stone (Sylvester Stewart) outside of his most famous band, Sly and the Family Stone.

Albums

Singles

Soundtrack contributions

Session work

Stone Flower Productions 
Sly Stone wrote, produced, and performed instrumentation for each single released on his Stone Flower label:

Little Sister 
For details on this group, see Little Sister (band)
 1970: "You're the One [Part 1]" / "You're the One [Part 2]" (US #22, R&B #4)
 1970: "Somebody's Watching You" / "Stanga" (US #32, R&B #8)

Joe Hicks 
 1969: "I'm Goin' Home" / "Home Sweet Home" (backed by Sly & the Family Stone on both sides)
 1970: "Life and Death in G & A" [Part 1] / "Life and Death in G & A" [Part 1]

6IX 
 1970: "I'm Just Like You" / "Dynamite"

Other collaborations

Compilations and other releases 
 1994: Precious Stone – Sly Stone in the Studio 1963-1965
 2010: Listen to the Voices – Sly Stone in the Studio 1965-1970
 2014: I'm Just Like You: Sly's Stone Flower 1969-70 – Light in the Attic

As a member of a group

The Stewart Four 
Members Sylvester Stewart, Freddie Stewart, Rose Stewart, and Vaetta Stewart
 1952: "On the Battlefield" / "Walking in Jesus' Name" (Church of God in Christ, Northern Sunday School Department)

The Viscaynes 
 1961: "Stop What You are Doing" / "I Guess I'll Be" (Tropo Records) 1
 1961: "Yellow Moon" / "Uncle Sam Needs You (My Friend)" (VPM Records) ²
 1961: "Yellow Moon" / "Heavenly Angel" (VPM Records)
 1976: "Oh What a Nite" / "You've Forgotten Me" (Subarro Records) ³

1 Tropo 101. Released as by "THE VISCAYNES AND THE RAMBLERS"

² VPM 1006. "Yellow Moon" comp.: Geo. Motola - R. Page. Record was first misprinted as The Biscaynes. This was a mistake because the band has always used the name VISCAYNES.

³ Subarro 489. A leftover George Motola production, "Oh What a Nite" (a remake of the Dells' 1956 hit), b/w "You've Forgotten Me" was credited "Sly Stone & the Biscaynes" when issued in 1976.

4 Sylvester Stewart / Sly Stone has nothing to do with the Stewart Brother singles released in the late 50s on the LA based Keen and Ensign labels. This was a different Sylvester Stewart.

References 

 Edwin & Arno Konings www.slystonebook.com

Sly and the Family Stone
Discographies of American artists
Pop music discographies
Rhythm and blues discographies